This page lists all badminton players who have won titles in BWF Super Series, BWF Grand Prix Gold and Grand Prix, and BWF World Tour events since the implementation of the circuit in 2007. This list is not provided by the Badminton World Federation (BWF), but by referring to the winners lists of the previous seasons. The only player to have won at least one title in every season of the circuit is Lee Chong Wei of Malaysia, who is also the all-time record holder of number of Super Series titles won at 46. The record for the most number of tournaments won in a single calendar year is held by Gao Ling of China who won an unprecedented nine titles in the 2007 BWF Super Series edition.

All-time list of badminton players with the most Super Series, Grand Prix, and World Tour titles 
Updated after 2021 BWF World Tour Finals.

Winners

Performance by nation

Winners by year 

 Super Series
 2007 BWF Super Series#Winners
 2008 BWF Super Series#Winners
 2009 BWF Super Series#Winners
 2010 BWF Super Series#Winners
 2011 BWF Super Series#Winners
 2012 BWF Super Series#Winners
 2013 BWF Super Series#Winners
 2014 BWF Super Series#Winners
 2015 BWF Super Series#Winners
 2016 BWF Super Series#Winners
 2017 BWF Super Series#Winners
 Grand Prix
 2007 BWF Grand Prix Gold and Grand Prix#Winners
 2008 BWF Grand Prix Gold and Grand Prix#Winners
 2009 BWF Grand Prix Gold and Grand Prix#Winners
 2010 BWF Grand Prix Gold and Grand Prix#Winners
 2011 BWF Grand Prix Gold and Grand Prix#Winners
 2012 BWF Grand Prix Gold and Grand Prix#Winners
 2013 BWF Grand Prix Gold and Grand Prix#Winners
 2014 BWF Grand Prix Gold and Grand Prix#Winners
 2015 BWF Grand Prix Gold and Grand Prix#Winners
 2016 BWF Grand Prix Gold and Grand Prix#Winners
 2017 BWF Grand Prix Gold and Grand Prix#Winners

 World Tour
 2018 BWF World Tour#Winners
 2019 BWF World Tour#Winners
 2020 BWF World Tour#Winners
 2021 BWF World Tour#Winners

References 

Players
BWF Grand Prix Gold and Grand Prix
BWF World Tour
Superseries
Superseries players